Thysanocrepis is a genus of moths belonging to the subfamily Olethreutinae of the family Tortricidae.

Species
Thysanocrepis celebensis Diakonoff, 1975
Thysanocrepis crossota (Meyrick, 1911)

See also
List of Tortricidae genera

References

External links
tortricidae.com

Olethreutini
Tortricidae genera
Taxa named by Alexey Diakonoff